Clearwater is a city located in Pinellas County, Florida, United States, west of Tampa and North of St. Petersburg. To the west of Clearwater lies the Gulf of Mexico and to the southeast lies Tampa Bay. As of the 2020 census, the city had a population of 117,292. Clearwater is the county seat of Pinellas County and is the smallest of the three principal cities in the Tampa–St. Petersburg–Clearwater metropolitan area, most commonly referred to as the Tampa Bay Area.

Cleveland Street is one of the city's historic avenues, and the city includes BayCare Ballpark and Coachman Park. The city is separated by the Intracoastal Waterway from Clearwater Beach.

Clearwater is the home of Clearwater Marine Aquarium.

The spiritual headquarters of the Church of Scientology is located in Clearwater.

History

Present-day Clearwater was originally the home of the Tocobaga people. Around 1835, the United States Army began construction of Fort Harrison, named after William Henry Harrison, as an outpost during the Seminole Wars. The fort was located on a bluff overlooking Clearwater Harbor, which later became part of an early 20th-century residential development called Harbor Oaks. University of South Florida archaeologists excavated the site in 1962 after Mark Wyllie discovered an underground ammunition bunker while planting a tree in his yard.

The area's population grew after the Federal Armed Occupation Act of 1842 offered  to anyone who would bear arms and cultivate the land. Early settlers included the Stevens, Stevenson, Sever and McMullen families, who claimed and farmed large tracts of land. Prior to 1906, the area was known as Clear Water Harbor. The name "Clear Water" is thought to have come from a fresh water spring flowing from near where the City Hall building is located today. There were many other freshwater springs that dotted the bluff, many in the bay or harbor itself.

Originally part of Hillsborough County, the first road joining Clearwater and Tampa was built in 1849, which dramatically reduced the prior day-long commute between the cities.

During the American Civil War, Union gunboats repeatedly raided the community's supplies, as most of the able-bodied men were away fighting for the Confederate Army. The town began developing in the late nineteenth century, prompted by Peter Demens' completion of the first passenger railroad line into the city in 1888. Clearwater was incorporated in 1891, with James E. Crane becoming the first mayor. The area's popularity as a vacation destination grew after railroad magnate Henry B. Plant built a sprawling Victorian resort hotel named Belleview Biltmore just south of Clearwater in 1897.

By the early 1900s, Clearwater's population had grown to around 400, ballooning to nearly 1,000 in the winter. Clearwater's oldest existing newspaper, the Clearwater Sun, was first published on March 14, 1914. Clearwater was reincorporated, this time as a city, on May 27, 1915, and was designated the county seat for Pinellas County, which broke from Hillsborough County in 1912. In 1915, a bridge was built across Clearwater Harbor, joining the city with Clearwater Beach to the west. Clearwater Beach, although located on a separate barrier island, belongs to the city of Clearwater and fronts the Gulf of Mexico. A new, much higher bridge now arcs over the bay, replacing the former drawbridge; the connecting road is part of State Road 60 and is called Clearwater Memorial Causeway.

During World War II, Clearwater became a major training base for US troops destined for Europe and the Pacific. Virtually every hotel in the area, including the Belleview Biltmore and the Fort Harrison Hotel, was used as a barracks for new recruits. Vehicle traffic was regularly stopped for companies of soldiers marching through downtown, and nighttime blackouts to confuse potential enemy bombers were common practice. The remote and isolated Dan's Island, now the highrise-dominated Sand Key, was used as a target by U.S. Army Air Corps fighter-bombers for strafing and bombing practice.

Timeline

 1888
 Settlement of Clear Water Harbor founded.
 "Narrow-gauge railroad" begins operating.
 1891
 Town of Clear Water Harbor incorporated.
 1894 – Orange Belt Railroad begins operating.
 1897 – Belleview Hotel in business in nearby Belleair.
 1900 – Population: 343.
 1905 – Population: 610.
 1906 – Clear Water Harbor renamed "Clearwater".
 1911 – Clearwater Yacht Club formed.
 1912 – Clearwater designated seat of newly created Pinellas County.
 1914
 Clearwater Evening Sun newspaper begins publication.
 Tampa and Gulf Coast Railroad begins operating.
 1915 – City of Clearwater incorporated.
 1916 – Public library and bridge to Clearwater Beach built.
 1918 – Pinellas County Courthouse built.
 1920 – Population: 2,427.
 1921 – Capitol Theatre in business.
 1923 – Peace Memorial Church built.
 1926 – Fort Harrison Hotel rebuilt.
 1930 – Population: 7,607.
 1948 – WTAN radio begins broadcasting.
 1950 – Population: 15,581.
 1953 – Palm Drive-In cinema in business.
 1959 – WAZE radio begins broadcasting.
 1970 – Population: 52,074.
 1972 – Marine Science Center established.
 1976
 Church of Scientology headquartered in Clearwater.
 Countryside Six cinema in business.
 1978 – May 4: Tornado occurs.
 1980 – Population: 85,170.
 1984 – Regional Pinellas Suncoast Transit Authority formed.
 1998 – City website online (approximate date).
 2004 – Clearwater Public Library new building opens.
 2005 – Clearwater Memorial Causeway opens.
 2010 – Population: 107,685.
 2012 – George Cretekos becomes mayor.
 2013 – Church of Scientology's Super Power Building dedicated.
 2017 – Charlie Crist becomes U.S. representative for Florida's 13th congressional district.
 2018 – The shooting of Markeis McGlockton receives national attention and triggers a debate regarding stand-your-ground laws.

Geography

Downtown
Clearwater's downtown has been undergoing major redevelopment in recent years. General beautification has been done along with completion of several high-rise condos and a large marina. New bars, restaurants, and other amenities are coming to the area, renamed the "Cleveland Street District". Royalty Theatre is also slated to be renovated.

Climate
Clearwater has a humid subtropical climate. Clearwater is far enough south that it lies in the broad transition zone from subtropical to tropical climates. As such, Clearwater is mostly warm to hot year round, with few nights of frost. Most of the annual rainfall comes in the wet season (June through September), when daily thundershowers erupt due to the strong solar heating. The dry season starts in October and runs through May, at which time the weather is sunny, dry, and there is little change in daily weather.

Demographics

 

Between 2014 and 2018, there were 46,667 households with an average household size of 2.4. In 2019, the city's population was spread out, with 18.7% under the age of 18, 59.4% between the age of 18 and 64, and 21.9% who were 65 years of age or older.

Between 2014 and 2018, the median income for a household in the city was $47,070, and the median income for a family was $46,228. 15.9% of the population fell below the poverty line.

Languages
As of 2000, speakers of English as their first language were 84.43% of residents, Spanish as a mother tongue was 8.55%, Greek accounted for 1.15%, French made up 1.00% of speakers, German at 0.97%, and Italian speakers comprised 0.85% of the population.

Economy
Clearwater's economy employs nearly 50,400 people. Major employers include Morton Plant Hospital, Tech Data, and Honeywell. Employment in Clearwater grew 1.84% from 2015 to 2016 with 50,345 people in the workforce. The most common job groups include Service, Sales & Office, Science, and Business. As of 2020, the median household income for Clearwater was $50,335, which is below the average for both the United States as well as the state of Florida.

Art and culture

In 2012, the city was listed among the 10 best places to retire in the U.S. by CBS Money Watch.

Tourism

Clearwater Public Art and Design Program
The Clearwater Public Art and Design Program, adopted by City Council in 2005, is funded through a 1% allocation on all city capital improvement projects valued at more than $500,000. The program commissions an average of 2–3 new projects per year.

Capitol and Royalty Theatre
Pre-Capitol Theatre, a bandstand stood at 405 Cleveland Street in Downtown Clearwater, where the community gathered to listen to music. The names of locals serving in World War I were etched on the wall of the adjacent Clearwater Sun building; this "Panel of Honor" was obscured when the original Capitol Theatre was built but uncovered when the newspaper building was torn down in 2013.

The Capitol Theatre opened March 21, 1921.  It was built by Senator-elect John Stansel Taylor. The theater's architect was Lester Avery and the contractor was John D. Phillipoff. Avery is known for his architecture in Miami. Philipoff also built the Coachman Building (1916), the Donald Roebling Estate in Belleair (added to the National Register of Historic Places in 1979), the old Pinellas County Courthouse (added to the National Register of Historic Places in 1992), other historical homes which have been saved, and did work at the Belleview Hotel.

Groundbreaking was December 6, 1920. The "New Capitol Theatre" was damaged in a storm on October 26, 1921 (so it had been completed). A theatre organ was installed in 1922, to accompany silent films with music. The organ was made and installed by the Robert Morton Organ Company.

Donald Roebling was a frequent patron, having his own double seat installed at the theatre.

The theatre was managed by various movie companies (EJ Sparks, Paramount, ABC-Southeastern Theatres, and Plitt Southern) and played the most recent movies of the day. The theatre also offered vaudeville on Friday nights in the 1930s. Headliners included Sally Rand, Fred Stone and his daughter, and Lum and Abner (of radio). The theatre was renovated in 1962. The Morton theatre organ was most likely removed during this renovation. When Plitt Southern did not renew their contract in 1979, Bill Neville and Jerry Strain tried to save the theatre with film classics and reduced prices. However, the theatre closed its doors on October 28, 1980.

Royalty Theater Company signed leases with the Taylor family in February 1981 when it then became known as the Royalty Theater (Clearwater, Florida). The building was renovated with Ron Winter of Winter Associates as the contractor and Scott Musheff as the architect.

During the renovations, Bill Neville's murdered body was found in the balcony.

The theatre remained in the Taylor family estate until it was sold in 1996. In July 2008 the building went into foreclosure.

In January 2009, the City of Clearwater and Ruth Eckerd Hall joined forces to purchase the theatre (renamed Capitol Theatre) as well as the neighboring Pat Lokey building as part of a renovation and revitalization of the historic Capitol Theater. Fowler Associates Architects, Inc. was selected for the renovation of the Capitol Theatre. The $10 million renovation and expansion began in 2012 and was completed in 2013. In 2019, a $2.5 million donation renamed the building the Nancy and David Bilheimer Capitol Theatre.

Clearwater Public Library System
In 1911, the city of Clearwater witnessed a vast population increase as well as acquiring telephones, electricity, paved streets and an ice factory. It is during this time that the Clearwater Library Association opened a subscription library on the second floor of the local People's Bank. Its popularity and support led to the request of $10,000 from the Carnegie Foundation to build a public library. The building was designed by Tampa architect F.J. Kennard. In its first year, the library had over 1,277 visitors and 2,792 books borrowed. As a vacation town, the library provided free access to materials for all residents and winter visitors.

During the Depression, the Clearwater Public Library faced many of the same threats seen at other libraries seen throughout the United States. This includes increased patron usage and dwindling budget. In the 1940s, the Clearwater library increased its staff from three assistants to five assistants. The library's collection also grew from 18,047 to over 100,000. To account for this increase, the Librarian and Board President Traver Bayly made an appeal to the City Commission for additional space.

As a result of segregation, the Clearwater Public Library was for White patrons only from its founding in 1911 to the mid-twentieth century. In 1950, the City Commission agreed to the building of the North Greenwood library. Designed by Architect Eugene Beach, the new library allowed access for the city's African American population to many information sources. This library was renovated in 1984. The new Main library was rebuilt beginning in 2000. It opened in May 2004.

As the population continued to increase throughout the late twentieth century, the library system continued to grow. The Clearwater Public Library System now includes five libraries: Clearwater Main, Countryside, North Greenwood, Beach, and East. In recent years, the Clearwater Public Library System has become increasingly digital, providing patrons with access to computers, online databases, and an online library catalog. This was made possible by the Greater Clearwater Public Library Foundation, Inc. which formed in 1984. As a part of the library's Centennial Celebration, a project is commencing to add makerspaces to the libraries. The Main library's makerspace is the "Studios at Main" and targets creative arts making.

The Clearwater Public Library System is a contributor to the Pinellas Memory Project. This system of libraries is part of the Pinellas Public Library Cooperative which seeks to provide patrons with access to information and programs to benefit the community.

Clearwater Marine Aquarium 

The Clearwater Marine Aquarium is a small non-profit aquarium. Opening in 1972 on Clearwater Beach, the aquarium is most famous for Winter the dolphin. Rescued as a calf in 2005, Winter was one of the first dolphins to have been fitted with a prosthetic tail after losing it due to entanglement in a crab trap. The aquarium is also home to other dolphins, otters, pelicans, nurse sharks, and turtles among several species of fish and other marine life. CMA also assists in animal strandings and other emergencies regarding sea life. Animals that have stranded are rehabilitated, and if possible, released back into the wild once they have made a full recovery. It has been featured as the main setting of the American family movie series Dolphin Tale.

Sports
BayCare Ballpark in Clearwater is the spring training home of Major League Baseball's Philadelphia Phillies, as well as their Low-A affiliate, the Clearwater Threshers.

Parks and recreation
The preserve also features the Moccasin Lake Environmental Education Center, which offers environmental education classes, programs and camps. The Center features live rehabilitated birds of prey, reptiles, amphibians and aquatic wildlife. It opened in 1982. The City of Clearwater contains five pools: Ross Norton, North Greenwood, Morningside, the Long Center, and Clearwater Beach. Swim lessons are offered throughout the year to patrons, and the pools have both a recreation summer pool league and the Clearwater Aquatics Team. These pools have participated in the World's Largest Swim Lesson.

Government

The City of Clearwater is administered by a council-manager form of government, and the city manager serves as the chief executive and administrative officer of the city.

The Clearwater City Council comprises the mayor and four council members, each of whom serves a four-year term. The council is responsible for setting policies and making decisions on local government issues including tax rates, annexations, property code variances and large contract awards. The city manager and city council are supported by the various city departments.

Education
 St. Petersburg College
 Everest University
 Clearwater High School
 Clearwater Central Catholic High School
 Ultimate Medical Academy
 Clearwater Academy International
 Clearwater Christian College
Nova Southeastern University

Transportation

Airport
Tampa International Airport serves Clearwater and the rest of the Tampa Bay Area as the primary means of air travel. St. Petersburg-Clearwater International Airport has also seen its usage increase. The city owns Clearwater Air Park.

Public transportation
The Pinellas Suncoast Transit Authority (PSTA) bus service is currently Pinellas County's only general public transit.  The service offers approximately 35 local routes, two express routes which cross Tampa Bay to the east, and a beach trolley that runs north and south along the county's roughly  chain of barrier islands.

Notable people
 Kristie Alley, television and film actress
 Austin Aries, professional wrestler
 Sara Blakely, founder of Spanx, Inc. and a minority owner of the Atlanta Hawks
 Donald Byrd (born 1949), modern dance choreographer
 Ricky Carmichael, supercross/motocross racer
 Ken Climo, professional disc golfer, 12-time PDGA Professional Open World Champion and three-time PDGA Professional Masters World Champion
Carter W. Clarke, U.S. Army General who oversaw the Venona project and much of the post-war investigation into the intelligence failure that lead to the Pearl Harbor Attack spent his retirement in Clearwater
Chick Corea, jazz pianist
 Tom Cruise, actor and film producer
 Jeremiah George, former American football player
 Raquel Gibson, model and actress, and Playboy Playmate of the Month (November 2005)
 Joseph W. Hatchett, Florida Supreme Court Justice 
 Hulk Hogan, professional wrestler 
 Howard Johnson, 1986 World Series Champion with the New York Mets, Major League Baseball third baseman
 Evel Knievel, stuntman
 Nigel Mansell, 1992 Formula One World Champion, resident during early 1990s
 Clark Mills, creator of international Optimist dinghy (first sailed in Clearwater)
 Kirstjen Nielsen, former United States Secretary of Homeland Security
 Tilian Pearson, musician, lyricist, and vocalist for post-hardcore band Dance Gavin Dance
 Lisa Marie Presley, former resident
 Jimmy Roselli, singer-pianist,  WWII veteran  
 Melanie Safka, singer-songwriter
 Juliet Simms, musician, Scientologist, contestant on The Voice, resident from 1994 to 2006
 Lynn D. Stewart, co-founder of the Hooters restaurant chain
 Elsie Thompson, supercentenarian
 Keith Thurman, professional boxer

Church of Scientology

Beginning in the 1970s under the code-name Project Normandy, the Church of Scientology began targeting Clearwater in order to "establish area control" of the city and county. The operations were exposed in a Pulitzer Prize winning series of articles in the Clearwater Sun.

Gabe Cazares, who was the mayor of Clearwater at the time, went so far as to call it "the occupation of Clearwater" and later characterized it as a "paramilitary operation by a terrorist group". The Church of Scientology targeted Cazares, attempting to entrap him in a sex scandal. Scientology also staged a phony hit-and-run accident with Cazares in an attempt to discredit him. Cazares and his wife sued the Church of Scientology for $1.5 million. The church settled with Cazares in 1986.

The Church of Scientology's "spiritual headquarters" are located in downtown Clearwater. The Church refers to Clearwater as its "Flag Land Base".

Sister cities
Clearwater has city partnerships with the following cities:

  Nagano, Japan
  Kalamaria, Greece
  Wyong, New South Wales, Australia

References

Bibliography

 
 
  
 
  
 1973 ed.
 Hampton Dunn. Yesterday's Clearwater. Miami: E.A. Seeman Publishing, 1973.

External links

 City of Clearwater official website
 Clearwater Beach Tourism website with live webcams
 
 
 Items related to Clearwater, Florida, various dates (via Digital Public Library of America)

 
Cities in Pinellas County, Florida
Populated coastal places in Florida on the Gulf of Mexico
Populated places on Tampa Bay
County seats in Florida
Seaside resorts in Florida
Populated places established in 1842
Cities in Florida
1891 establishments in Florida